Constituent Assembly elections were held in France on 23 and 24 April 1848 to elect the Constituent Assembly of the new Republic. Over nine million citizens were eligible to vote in the first French election since 1792 held under male universal suffrage.

Results

References

Legislative elections in France
France
Legislative
French Second Republic